I'll Be Seeing You is a 1944 American drama film made by Selznick International Pictures, Dore Schary Productions, and Vanguard Pictures, and distributed by United Artists.  It stars Joseph Cotten, Ginger Rogers, and Shirley Temple, with Spring Byington, Tom Tully, and John Derek. It was produced by Dore Schary, with David O. Selznick as executive producer. The screenplay was by Marion Parsonnet, based on a radio play by Charles Martin (1910-1983).

The soundtrack includes the song "I'll Be Seeing You", which had become a hit that year, although it dated back to 1938. The film's title was taken from the song, at the suggestion of Schary.

Plot
Social outcasts Mary Marshall (Ginger Rogers) and Sgt. Zachary Morgan (Joseph Cotten) meet while seated across from each other on a train bound for Pinehill. Zach, a victim of PTSD, then termed shell shock, has just been granted a ten-day leave from a military hospital to try to readjust to daily life. Mary, convicted for involuntary manslaughter, has just been given an eight-day furlough from prison to spend the Christmas holiday with her aunt and uncle in Pinehill. Each harbours a secret. Mary lies to Zach that she is a travelling saleslady on her way to spend the holidays with her family, while Zach tells Mary that he is going to visit his sister in Pinehill. After the train pulls into the station, the two exchange names. Mary then goes to the Marshall home, where she is reunited with her Uncle Henry (Tom Tully), Aunt Sarah (Spring Byington) and cousin Barbara (Shirley Temple).

Zach, meanwhile, checks into the YMCA. Unsure of herself after a three-year confinement in prison, Mary laments the loss of her youthful dreams of having a husband and family. Soon after, Zach phones and Mary invites him to dinner. After the meal, Zach confesses to Mary that he has no sister and stopped in Pinehill just to be near her. He and Mary then attend a war movie, but Zach falls mute when Mary questions him about his own experiences in the war. While stopping at a café afterward, Zach panics when the soda jerk, Swanson (Chill Wills), who is afflicted with a facial tic, recounts being shell-shocked during World War I. Apprehensive that his affliction will also result in disfigurement, Zach flees the café and is unable to share his fears with Mary.

Upon returning home, Mary, who is sharing Barbara's room, finds that Barbara has labeled her possessions. Realising that Barbara distrusts her, Mary relates the circumstances that sent her to prison. After the death of her parents, Mary had gone to work as a secretary. One night, her wealthy boss invited her to dinner at his apartment and Mary naively accepted, believing that he was inviting her to a party. Shocked to discover that she was the only guest, Mary was then accosted by her drunken boss. While struggling to avoid his advances, Mary pushed him away, sending him to his death through an open window, and Mary was sentenced to six years in prison. At the end of Mary's story, Barbara, who is touched by her cousin's misfortune, begs her forgiveness.

The next day, Zach invites Mary to the lake and there explains his behaviour of the previous night. After voicing his fears of becoming like Swanson, Zach asks Mary to help him believe in himself as she believes in herself. Over Christmas dinner at the Marshall house, Zach rhapsodizes about feeling at home with the family. Aware that her stay with the family is temporary, Mary becomes despondent and asks Aunt Sarah if she should tell Zach the truth. Sarah counsels her to remain silent. When Zach invites the Marshall family to the New Year's Eve party at the YMCA, Sarah buys Mary a new dress for the occasion. At the party, a US Senator solicits Zach's opinion as a soldier on political issues, and Zach outspokenly replies that each soldier is an individual and, as such, holds different opinions. While walking home with Mary after the dance, Zach is attacked by a dog and fends off the animal until its owner arrives to restrain it. As Mary bids Zach goodnight, she comments that he has regained his confidence and is now recovered. Knowing that they are both scheduled to leave the next day, Zach tries to discuss their future together; but Mary feigns sleepiness and asks to delay the discussion. Entering the house in tears, Mary confides her love for Zach to Sarah.

Meanwhile, after jubilantly returning to his hotel room, Zach suffers a relapse but is restored by recalling the sound of Mary's voice. The next day, Zach comes to the Marshall house to say goodbye. While alone with Zach, Barbara, not knowing that Zach is unaware of her cousin's conviction, mentions some of  the details of Mary's prison sentence. Mary senses that something is wrong when Zach suddenly becomes distant and silently boards the train. Upon returning home, Mary discovers that Barbara has divulged her secret and collapses, weeping. But that night, as Mary approaches the gates of the state prison, Zach steps from the shadows to embrace her and declare his love.

Cast
 Ginger Rogers as Mary Marshall
 Joseph Cotten as Zachary Morgan
 Shirley Temple as Barbara Marshall
 Spring Byington as Sarah Marshall
 Tom Tully as Henry Marshall
 John Derek as Lt. Bruce 
 Chill Wills as Swanson
 Kenny Bowers as Sailor On Train
 Gary Gray as Franklin (uncredited)
 Olin Howland as Train Vendor (uncredited)

Reception
The film was a big hit, earning $3 million in domestic rentals. Producer Dore Schary's share of the profits came to $97,000.

See also
List of American films of 1944
 List of Christmas films

References

External links
 
 
 
 

1944 films
1940s Christmas drama films
American Christmas drama films
American black-and-white films
Films based on radio series
Films directed by William Dieterle
Films scored by Daniele Amfitheatrof
Films set on the home front during World War II
Films set around New Year
Selznick International Pictures films
United Artists films
1944 drama films
1940s English-language films
1940s American films